The 2010 Harrogate Council election took place on 6 May 2010 to elect members of Harrogate Borough Council in North Yorkshire, England. One third of the council was up for election and the Conservative party gained overall control of the council from no overall control.

After the election, the composition of the council was
Conservative 28
Liberal Democrat 22
Independent 4

Election result
The results saw the Conservative party win a majority on the council after making a net gain of 1 seat to hold 28 of the 54 seats. The Conservatives took the seats of Ripon Minster and Ripon Spa from independents, but lost a seat to the Liberal Democrats in High Harrogate. Control of the council came down to the last seat declared in Low Harrogate, with the Conservative holding the seat by 6 votes over the Liberal Democrats to gain a majority. This meant the Liberal Democrats ended 1 seat up on 22 councillors, while the independents lost 2 to have 4 seats. Overall turnout in the election was 68.30%.

Ward results

References

2010
2010 English local elections
May 2010 events in the United Kingdom
2010s in North Yorkshire